TIROS-M, also known as ITOS-1 was a weather satellite operated by the Environmental Science Services Administration (ESSA). It was part of a series of satellites called ITOS, or improved TIROS. TIROS-M was launched on a Delta rocket on January 23, 1970. The launch carried one other satellite, Australis-OSCAR 5. It was deactivated on June 18, 1971.

References

1970 in spaceflight
Weather satellites of the United States
Spacecraft launched in 1970